John Hewitt Jellett (25 December 1817 – 19 February 1888) was an Irish mathematician whose career was spent at Trinity College Dublin (TCD), where he rose to the rank of Provost. He was also a priest in the Church of Ireland.

Life
He was the son of Rev. Morgan Jellett (c. 1787–1832),  later rector of Tullycorbet,  County Monaghan,  and his wife Harriette Townsend, daughter of Hewitt Baldwin Poole, Esq. (died 1800), of County Cork, by his wife Dorothea Morris. He was born at Cashel, County Tipperary, and educated at Kilkenny College and at TCD, where he became a fellow in 1840. He was the eldest brother of Hewitt Poole Jellett, Serjeant-at-law (Ireland) and Chairman of the Quarter Sessions  for County Laois, and of the Venerable Henry Jellett, Archdeacon of Cloyne.

John Hewitt Jellett married his cousin on his mother's side, Dorothea Charlotte Morris Morgan (c. 1824–1911), daughter of James Morgan, on 7 July 1855 and had seven children. His son 
William Morgan Jellett  was a member of the Parliament of the United Kingdom: he was the father of the celebrated artist Mainie Jellett,  and of Dorothea Jellett,   director of the orchestra of the Gaiety Theatre, Dublin.  Another son Henry Holmes Jellett was a civil engineer in British India. His daughter Harriette Mary Jellett was wife of the noted Irish physicist George Francis FitzGerald. Another daughter Eva Jellett  was the first woman to graduate with a degree in medicine from Trinity, and went on to practice as a doctor in India.

He died of blood poisoning at the Provost's House, TCD, on 19 February 1888, and was buried in Mount Jerome Cemetery on 23 February. The funeral  procession was the largest that ever left Trinity.

Career
He graduated B.A. in mathematics in 1837, M.A. 1843, B.D. 1866, and D.D. 1881. He had been ordained a priest in 1846. In 1848 he was elected to the chair of natural philosophy at TCD, and in 1868 he received the appointment of commissioner of Irish national education.

In 1851 he was awarded the Cunningham Medal of the Royal Irish Academy for his work on the "Calculus of Variations". The society later elected him their president, a position he held from 1869 to 1874.

In 1870, on the death of Dr. Thomas Luby, he became a Senior Fellow and thus a member of the College Board. Gladstone's government in February 1881 appointed Jellett provost of Trinity. In the same year, he was awarded a Royal Medal by the Royal Society.

After the disestablishment of the Church of Ireland he took an active part in the deliberations of the general synod and in every work calculated to advance its interests. He was an able mathematician, and wrote A Treatise of the Calculus of Variations (1850), and A Treatise on the Theory of Friction (1872), as well as several papers on pure and applied mathematics, articles in the Transactions of the Royal Irish Academy. He also wrote some theological essays, sermons, and religious treatises, of which the principal were An Examination of some of the Moral Difficulties of the Old Testament (1867), and The Efficacy of Prayer (1878).

References

Attribution

1817 births
1888 deaths
Alumni of Trinity College Dublin
Burials at Mount Jerome Cemetery and Crematorium
Church of Ireland priests
Fellows of Trinity College Dublin
Irish mathematicians
Presidents of the Royal Irish Academy
19th-century Irish Anglican priests
People educated at Kilkenny College
People from County Tipperary
Provosts of Trinity College Dublin
Royal Medal winners